Calodromius is a genus of ground beetle native to the Palearctic (including Europe), the Near East and North Africa. It contains the following species:

 Calodromius bifasciatus (Dejean, 1825)
 Calodromius henoni (Bedel, 1907)
 Calodromius ingens (Andrewes, 1933)
 Calodromius lebioides (Bedel, 1900)
 Calodromius mayeti (Bedel, 1907)
 Calodromius putzeysi (Paulino de Oliveira, 1876)
 Calodromius sphex (Andrewes, 1933)
 Calodromius spilotus (Illiger, 1798)

References

External links
Calodromius at Fauna Europaea

Lebiinae